Florence Howard Pendleton (January 28, 1926 – September 10, 2020) was an American political activist who served as a shadow senator from the District of Columbia from 1991 to 2007. 

Pendleton's main goal as shadow senator was to promote the efforts of the District of Columbia to gain full voting rights. She was inaugurated as the first ever shadow senator from the District of Columbia on January 3, 1991. She was known as “The Education Senator” because of her legacy as a life-long educator, administrator of DC Public Schools, and founder of the nonprofit “STAND”, The Society for Teaching Americans about New Columbia and DC Statehood.

Pendleton defended her seat in 2000, cruising to victory in the general election over Janet Helms, beating her 84%–14%. Her re-election bid in 2006 failed when Philip Pannell successfully challenged that she failed to have 2,000 valid signatures to get onto the ballot, having only 1,559. She ran as a write-in candidate, but only won 1,363 votes as Michael Donald Brown cruised to victory with 62,415 votes over her and Pannell's 21,552 votes to win the Democratic Primary.  Her last day in office was on January 3, 2007.

Background
Pendleton graduated from Howard University with a Bachelor of Science degree and a Master of Science and she was a doctoral student at Virginia Tech.

Election history

1990

In the general election, the top two vote getters were elected as Shadow senators of each seat, with Pendleton taking Seat 1 and Jackson taking Seat 2.

1994

2000

2006

Pendleton got kicked off the Democratic primary ballot for not getting enough valid signatures to qualify for the election. She ran as a write-in candidate with little success.

Political career
 November 6, 1990 — elected shadow senator when office was created
 November 8, 1994 — reelected shadow senator
 November 7, 2000 — reelected shadow senator
 2006 — filed to run for reelection but was knocked off the primary ballot when her opponent Phil Pannell challenged the signatures on her petition

See also
 United States congressional delegations from the District of Columbia

References

|-

1926 births
2020 deaths
People from Columbus, Georgia
Howard University alumni
Virginia Tech alumni
United States shadow senators from the District of Columbia
Women in Washington, D.C., politics
Washington, D.C., Democrats
21st-century American women